Glaucoclystis is a genus of moths in the family Geometridae.

Species
Glaucoclystis acygonia (Swinhoe, 1895)
Glaucoclystis albicetrata Prout, 1958
Glaucoclystis azumai (Inoue, 1971)
Glaucoclystis expedita (Prout, 1958)
Glaucoclystis gonias (Turner, 1904)
Glaucoclystis griseorufa (Hampson, 1898)
Glaucoclystis immixtaria (Walker, 1862)
Glaucoclystis hyperocha (Prout, 1958)
Glaucoclystis polyclealis (Walker, 1859)
Glaucoclystis polyodonta (Swinhoe, 1895)
Glaucoclystis satoi Inoue, 2002
Glaucoclystis sinuosa (Swinhoe, 1895)
Glaucoclystis sinuosoides Holloway, 1997
Glaucoclystis spinosa (Inoue, 1971)

References

External links

Eupitheciini